Alsophila glaberrima, synonym Cyathea glaberrima, is a species of tree fern endemic to the D'Entrecasteaux Islands, specifically Fergusson Island and Goodenough Island, where it grows in mossy forest at an altitude of . The stipe is finely warty and bears numerous glossy scales with fragile edges. Sori are produced close to the fertile pinnule midvein. They are protected by small, dark brown indusia that are scale-like in appearance.

References

glaberrima
Flora of Papua New Guinea